= John Stanard (inventor) =

American inventor (1868-1900

- Born: June 15, 1868; Newark, New Jersey, U.S.
- Died: 1900
- Occupation: Inventor
- Known for: Improvements to the refrigerator and oil stove

John Stanard (often misspelled as John Standard; June 15, 1868 – 1900) was an American inventor from Newark, New Jersey, who was granted two patents for improvements to kitchen appliances. His innovations in the late 19th century focused on the efficiency of non-electrical refrigeration and the compact design of oil-burning stoves.

== Early life ==
Stanard was born on June 15, 1868, in Newark, New Jersey, reportedly to Mary and Joseph Stanard. Little is recorded regarding his formal education or professional training, a common occurrence for African-American innovators of the post-Reconstruction era.

== Inventions and patents ==
=== Oil stove (1889) ===
On October 29, 1889, Stanard was granted U.S. Patent No. 413,689 for an improvement in oil stoves. His design was noted for its portability and compact nature, which he suggested would be particularly useful for buffet-style meals served on trains.

=== Refrigerator (1891) ===
On July 14, 1891, Stanard received U.S. Patent No. 455,891 for improvements in refrigerators. Unlike modern electric units, Stanard's design improved upon the icebox model of the era. His configuration used a manually filled ice chamber and included a system of air ducts and perforations to improve cold air circulation. Stanard's design also incorporated a separate compartment for drinking water, ensuring it remained chilled without absorbing odors from stored food. It was the first instance of a combined fridge-freezer appliance.

== Legacy ==
Stanard died in 1900 at the age of 31 or 32. His patents contributed to developments in household appliances during the late 19th century. His work is frequently cited in educational curricula regarding African-American contributions to the Industrial Revolution and the history of domestic technology in the United States.
